Palmetto Pass (often referenced as PAL PASS) is an electronic toll-collection system used on all toll roads in South Carolina.  It was originally administered by the South Carolina Department of Transportation and is now operated by the Connector 2000 Association, which operates the Southern Connector.

Palmetto Pass is now used on one toll road: the Southern Connector (Interstate 185) in Greenville County. Palmetto Pass was formerly used on the Cross Island Parkway (U.S. Highway 278) on Hilton Head Island until tolls were abolished on that road on June 30, 2021. The Palmetto Pass has no interoperability agreements with other states or agencies that operate electronic toll collection systems.

Tolls
As of March 1, 2021 new Palmetto Pass accounts can only be established through the Southern Connector website or agency office.  

On February 28, the Cross Island Parkway stopped issuing new Palmetto Pass accounts in anticipation of an end to tolling on the parkway on June 30, 2021.

As of January 2, 2022, Palmetto Pass users receive a 15-cent discount on the Southern Connector over cash users at each toll booth. The cost to travel from end to end on the Southern Connector is $3.70 (versus $4.00 for cash users) for two-axle vehicles.  On the Cross Island Parkway, Palmetto Pass users previously received a 50-cent discount at the main toll booth (paying .75 cents compared to the $1.25 cash toll rate).

See also
 Electronic toll collection
 Toll road
 Cross Island Parkway
 Southern Connector

References

External links
 Cross Island Parkway
 Southern Connector

Transportation in South Carolina
Electronic toll collection
Radio-frequency identification
Wireless locating